Ronald Leslie Irwin (23 October 1923 – 18 August 2009) was  a former Australian rules footballer who played 51 games as number 3 with Melbourne in the Victorian Football League (VFL) from 1943 to 1947.

Irwin was recruited from Glen Ormond in the Victorian Junior Amateur Association.  He also played in the football team from engineering firm Kelly and Lewis from 1941 to 1943.

In 1950, Irwin was appointed captain-coach of Yarraville in the Victorian Football Association after missing over 2 years of football due to a knee injury. After playing as a utility player and filling most key positions on the ground in 1950, he retired at the start of the 1951 season, due to a recurrence of his knee injury.

Notes

External links 

1923 births
2009 deaths
Australian rules footballers from Victoria (Australia)
Melbourne Football Club players